The 1991 Men's EuroHockey Nations Championship was the sixth edition of the Men's EuroHockey Nations Championship, the quadrennial international men's field hockey championship of Europe organized by the European Hockey Federation. It was held in Paris, France, from 12 to 23 June 1991.

Germany won their third title by defeating the two-time defending champions the Netherlands 3–1 in the final. England won the bronze medal by defeating the Soviet Union 2–1 in penalty strokes after the match finished 1–1 after extra time.

Preliminary round

Pool A

Pool B

Classification round

Ninth to twelfth place classification

9–12th place semi-finals

Eleventh place game

Ninth place game

Fifth to eighth place classification

5–8th place semi-finals

Seventh place game

Fifth place game

First to fourth place classification

Semi-finals

Third place game

Final

Final standings

See also
1991 Women's EuroHockey Nations Championship

References

Men's EuroHockey Nations Championship
EuroHockey Nations Championship
EuroHockey Nations Championship
International field hockey competitions hosted by France
International sports competitions hosted by Paris
EuroHockey Nations Championship
Field hockey at the Summer Olympics – Men's European qualification
EuroHockey Nations Championship